Anjunabeats Volume Five is the fifth album in the Anjunabeats Volume compilation series mixed and compiled by British trance group Above & Beyond, released on 21 May 2007.

Track listing

References

External links

2007 compilation albums
Above & Beyond (band) albums
Anjunabeats compilation albums
Sequel albums
Electronic compilation albums